Jordan Chan Siu-chun (born Chan Siu-tsun on 8 July 1967) is a Hong Kong actor, singer and dancer, known for starring in the Young and Dangerous film series and for his role in the 1998 TV adaptation of Louis Cha's novel, The Duke of Mount Deer. In recent years, he received renewed attention for his appearances in the Chinese reality shows Where Are We Going, Dad? in 2017 and Call Me By Fire (2021 and 2022).

Early life
Chan was born to a Hakka family in a rural village in Huizhou, Guangdong province, southern China. In 2018, Chan revealed in an interview that when he was young, his family was so poor that they didn't have enough to eat, and he once suggested to give his younger brother away to a rich family and for the suggestion, he received a beating from his parents. However his parents eventually did give away his young brother for HKD3,000. Chan also revealed that his father used to chain him up at home, afraid that he would run out of the house to play instead of taking care of his younger siblings. Chan also had to work the field, cut grass, and tend to cows. He left school in his teens when his family moved to Hong Kong. He and his family lived in cramped quarters within a slum, and Chan worked odd jobs at construction sites, as a cook at a dim sum restaurant, served at roadside hawker stalls, and apprenticed at a hair salon. 

Chan was charged and convicted of the molestation of an underaged girl when he was 14.

Career
Chan got his start by enrolling in the TVB Dancers' Training Class in 1985. Soon after graduation, he joined a few of the studio's troupes that would accompany popular singers during their live performances. He worked with artists such as Alan Tam, Leslie Cheung, and Anita Mui before being invited by a producer to make a record of his own.

In 1994, he made his film debut with Twenty Something. Chan has since received several Hong Kong Film Award nominations: two for his role in He's a Woman, She's a Man (1994), and one each for Heaven Can't Wait (1995) and Big Bullet (1996). With 1996's Young and Dangerous, Chan established himself as a mainstay of the triad genre. The film was a huge success, and led to nine sequels and spinoffs before the series concluded in 2000. In 2005, Chan starred alongside Jay Chou as Kyoichi Sudo in Initial D.

Musically, Chan is known for bringing a hip hop flavour to cantopop. With his recent releases beginning around 2002, he has rapped and added hip hop beats to his music. His hip hop style has brought him new fans, although some Hong Kong fans have accused him of acting "black." He continues to incorporate R&B and hip hop sounds into his music today.

Chan has spoken several lines of Hakka in some of his movies. He is the first singer to include Hakka verse in a Mandarin song, in "Heartless You", (算你恨) 2003.

Political positions and stances 
Chan was a  member of the Huizhou Committee of the Chinese People's Political Consultative Conference in 2014.

Chan endorsed pro-Beijing candidate Junius Ho in the 2016 Hong Kong legislative election.

During the 2019 Hong Kong protests, Chan signed a joint letter supporting the Fugitive Offenders amendment bill, saying that he had the right to support a side "as a Hongkonger".

In March 2021, Chan expressed his support for cotton from Xinjiang, after several companies stopped purchasing the cotton due to concerns about human rights violations.

Personal life 
Chan married actress Cherrie Ying on 14 February 2010, at Little White Wedding Chapel in Las Vegas.

Their first child, a son named Jasper, was born on 1 July 2013. On 29 May 2020, they welcomed their second child, a baby boy nicknamed Ho Ho.

Filmography

Film and television

Sources: IMDb, chinesemov.com

Variety show
1995-1996: Super Trio series: Movie Buff Championship
2015: Wanna Bros
2016: I love HK
2017: Where Are We Going, Dad? 5
2021: Call Me By Fire
2022: Call Me by Fire (season 2)

Discography

Big Event (1997)
Love Wife (1998)
Everyone Loves Jordan Chan (1998)
Picture Book (1999)
Mega Star Jordan Chan (1999)
Top Boyfriend (2000)
Amazing Ending Complication  (2000)
Embrace (2001)
Heartbroken King EP (2002)
That's Mine (2002)
Heartless You (2003)
Night Life New Songs +Compilation (2003)
Black Hole (2004)
Compete (2006)
Sing Jordan 10 Years New Songs + Compilation (2006)
Exclusive Memory (2008)

References

External links

 
 Jordan album lyrics and pics
 http://www.kino-teatr.ru/kino/movie/ros/37773/annot/

1967 births
Living people
Cantopop singers
Hong Kong male film actors
Hong Kong male singers
Hong Kong Mandopop singers
Hong Kong people of Hakka descent
Hong Kong singer-songwriters
Hong Kong male television actors
20th-century Hong Kong male actors
21st-century Hong Kong male actors
Hakka musicians
The Amazing Race contestants
People from Huizhou